The men's 400 metre individual medley competition at the 2014 South American Games took place on March 10 at the Estadio Nacional.  The last champion was Thiago Pereira of Brazil.

This race consisted of eight lengths of the pool. The first two lengths were swum using the butterfly stroke, the second pair with the backstroke, the third pair of lengths in breaststroke, and the final two were freestyle.

Records
Prior to this competition, the existing world and Pan Pacific records were as follows:

Results
All times are in minutes and seconds.

Heats
Heats weren't performed, as only eight swimmers had entered.

Final 
The final was held on March 10, at 21:05.

References

Swimming at the 2014 South American Games